This is a list of operators which have an Air Operator Certificate issued by the Civil Aviation Authority  of Ecuador.

Commercial airlines
This is a list of active airlines (May 2021).

Charter airlines

Government airlines

See also
List of defunct airlines of Ecuador
List of airlines

References

 
Airlines
Ecuador
Airlines
Ecuador